Zija Azizov (born 4 October 1998 in Moscow, Russia) is an Azerbaijani professional footballer who currently plays as a midfielder for Keşla in the Azerbaijan Premier League.

Club career

Den Bosch
On 8 August 2016, Azizov scored and two assist in his professional debut in the Eerste Divisie for FC Den Bosch, a 4–5 defeat at away to Jong PSV. He scored 4 goals in 34 matches during the 2016–17 season.

NEC Nijmegen
On 30 August 2018, Azizov signed one-year contract with Eerste Divisie side NEC Nijmegen.

Keşla
On 19 June 2019, Azizov signed one-year contract with Azerbaijan Premier League side Keşla FK.

Career statistics

References

External links
 
 
 

1998 births
Living people
Footballers from Moscow
Association football midfielders
Azerbaijani footballers
Azerbaijan youth international footballers
Azerbaijan under-21 international footballers
Azerbaijani expatriate footballers
Expatriate footballers in the Netherlands
Azerbaijani expatriate sportspeople in the Netherlands
FC Den Bosch players
NEC Nijmegen players
Shamakhi FK players
Eerste Divisie players
Azerbaijan Premier League players